Marcinków may refer to the following places in Poland:
Marcinków, Lower Silesian Voivodeship (south-west Poland)
Marcinków, Łódź Voivodeship (central Poland)
Marcinków, Silesian Voivodeship (south Poland)
Marcinków, Świętokrzyskie Voivodeship (south-central Poland)